is the 22nd single by the Japanese idol girl group AKB48, released on August 24, 2011. Its members were chosen by the AKB48 2011 general election. It won the Grand Prix of Japan Record Awards, which was the first time a female group accomplished it.

2011 general election 

The participating members were chosen by AKB48's 2011 general election. Each of AKB48's 21st single "Everyday, Kachusha" contained a ballot that allows the buyer to register a vote for one of the member candidates for the group's 22nd single. The top 21 vote-getters would get to participate in the title track, and the top 12 from the lineup would be prominently featured in its promotions. The winner of the general election was Atsuko Maeda, with Yuko Oshima as runner up. The members who were ranked 22 to 40 were grouped as "Under Girls" and recorded on one of the B-sides.

Tie-ins 
The title track was the theme song for the Fuji TV drama series Hanazakari no Kimitachi e 'Ikemen Paradise' 2011, which starred AKB48 member Atsuko Maeda. The track was also featured in a television commercial for Peach John's lingerie brand "Heart Bra", and starred AKB48 members Yuko Oshima, Haruna Kojima and Tomomi Kasai.

Music video 
The music video for "Flying Get" was directed by Yukihiko Tsutsumi. Its full version (included only in bonus disc for its single) lasts over 18 minutes and features a plot similar to those of action films. Instead releasing a normal MV on AKB48's official YouTube channel, a dance shot version (with the full song) was uploaded.

Reception 
The single sold 1,025,952 copies on the first day of its release, becoming the first single in Oricon history to sell over one million copies on its first day of release.

Flying Get hit No.1 in Rekochok monthly download ranking, and has been downloaded more than 1 Million copies.

Flying Get hit No.1 in weekly Hot 100, Hot Top Airplay, Hot Singles Sales, Adult Contemporary Airplay of Billboard Japan, and No.2 in Billboard Japan Hot 100 Year End.

"Flying Get" outsold the group's previous single, "Everyday, Katyusha", in the last week of sales in 2011, and became the overall number-one selling single of 2011.

Awards

Track listing

Music review 
Even though the "single CD" has several coupling songs, the review below talks about flying get mostly.

Review from Hotexpress describe this song has "electric guitar sings on the rhythm full of Latin flavor", “refrain like a roller coaster” and "this work would pioneer a new realm of idol music, and has a party tune that changes Japan to midsummer throughout the year, to everyone." Review from CDjournal states that it has "soulful sound and the hot positive message featuring the sound of passionate horn." Review in TokyoHeadline wrote that "Flying Get is a Latin rock-like music that starts with the samba rhythm reminiscent of a carnival", and the music video "likes a conspiracy and action-packed short film" and "is out of the ordinary".

Members

"Flying Get" 
The lineup for the main single consists of the top 21 members from AKB48's 2011 general election. The top 12 members were given additional media promotion.
The number in brackets indicates the member's ranking.

 Team A: Haruna Kojima (6), Asuka Kuramochi (21), Atsuko Maeda (1), Rino Sashihara (9), Mariko Shinoda (4), Minami Takahashi (7), Aki Takajō (12)
 Team K: Sayaka Akimoto (17), Tomomi Itano (8), Minami Minegishi (15), Sae Miyazawa (11), Yūko Ōshima (2), Yui Yokoyama (19)
 Team B: Tomomi Kasai (16), Yuki Kashiwagi (3), Rie Kitahara (13), Yuka Masuda (20), Amina Satō (18), Mayu Watanabe (5)
 SKE48 Team S: Jurina Matsui (14), Rena Matsui (10)

"Dakishimecha Ikenai" 
Performed by Under Girls, which consist of members who ranked 22 to 40 in AKB48's 2011 general election.
The number in brackets indicates the member's ranking.
Center: Ayaka Umeda (22)
 Team A: Ami Maeda (37), Haruka Nakagawa (24), Aika Ōta (25), Shizuka Ōya (29),
 Team K: Reina Fujie (40), Sakiko Matsui (38), Moeno Nito (31), Ayaka Umeda (22)
 Team B: Natsumi Hirajima (26), Mika Komori (32), Miho Miyazaki (27), Sumire Satō (34)
 Team 4: Miori Ichikawa (39), Mina Oba (35)
 SKE48 Team S: Masana Ōya (30), Akari Suda (36)
 SKE48 Team KII: Sawako Hata (33), Akane Takayanagi (23),
 NMB48 Team N: Sayaka Yamamoto (28)

"Seishun to Kizukanai Mama" 
The ending theme of Majisuka Gakuen 2

Center: Atsuko Maeda
 Team A: Aika Ota, Asuka Kuramochi, Haruna Kojima, Rino Sashihara, Mariko Shinoda, Aki Takajo, Minami Takahashi, Atsuko Maeda, Ami Maeda
 Team K: Sayaka Akimoto, Tomomi Itano, Yuko Oshima, Ayaka Kikuchi, Moeno Nito, Minami Minegishi, Sae Miyazawa, Yui Yokoyama
 Team B: Tomomi Kasai, Yuki Kashiwagi, Rie Kitahara, Mika Komori, Sumire Sato, Miho Miyazaki, Mayu Watanabe
 Team 4: Miori Ichikawa, Mina Oba, Haruka Shimazaki, Haruka Shimada, Mariya Nagao, Suzuran Yamauchi
 Team S: Jurina Matsui, Rena Matsui

"Ice no Kuchizuke" 
Performed by a special unit formed to promote Ezaki Glico's Ice no Mi, a bite-sized frozen candy. Gained worldwide headlines after the promotional campaign announced it would 'debut' a new member in the form of Aimi Eguchi, later revealed to the shock of many to be an advanced, CG-created amalgamation of six of the most popular members of the group voiced by 12th-generation kenkyūsei Yukari Sasaki.

 Team A: Atsuko Maeda, Mariko Shinoda, Minami Takahashi
 Team K: Tomomi Itano, Yuko Oshima
 Team B: Mayu Watanabe
 Kenkyūsei: Aimi Eguchi (Yukari Sasaki)

"Yasai Uranai" 
Performed by Yasai Sisters, a special unit for AKB48 single, "Heavy Rotation", where they sang Yasai Sisters and used in Kagome CM.

Center: Atsuko Maeda
 Team A: Team A: Aika Ota, Asuka Kuramochi, Haruna Kojima, Rino Sashihara, Mariko Shinoda, Aki Takajo, Minami Takahashi, Atsuko Maeda, Ami Maeda
 Team K: Sayaka Akimoto, Tomomi Itano, Yuko Oshima, Moeno Nito, Minami Minegishi, Sae Miyazawa, Yui Yokoyama
 Team B: Tomomi Kasai, Yuki Kashiwagi, Rie Kitahara, Mika Komori, Sumire Sato, Miho Miyazaki, Mayu Watanabe
 Team S: Jurina Matsui, Rena Matsui
 Team KII: Akane Takayanagi, Manatsu Mukaida
 Team E: Kanon Kimoto
 Team N: Sayaka Yamamoto, Miyuki Watanabe

Charts and certifications

Oricon Charts (Japan)

Taiwan Weekly Chart

Sales and certifications

SNH48 version 

"Flying Get" (Chinese: 飞翔入手, Pinyin: Fēixiáng rùshǒu) was redone in Mandarin for AKB48's sister group in China, SNH48, as the group's second single; it was released on August 2, 2013. This EP also contains Mandarin tracks for Ponytail to Shushu (Chinese: 马尾与发圈, Pinyin: Mǎwěi yǔ fā quān) and Chance no Junban (Chinese: 石头剪刀布, Pinyin: Shítou jiǎndāo bù).

Personnel
The track was sung by the first generation members of SNH48:
 Wu Zhehan, Gu Xiangjun, Kong Xiaoyin, Jiang Yuxi, Xu Jiaqi, Xu Chenchen, Dai Meng, Tang Min, Qiu Xinyi, Chen Guanhui, Chen Si, Qian Beiting, Zhao Jiamin, Zhang Yuge, Ding Ziyan, Dong Zhiyi, Mo Han, Li Yuqi

Development
On July 2, 2013 SNH48 announced the filming of "Flying Get" to be held at the Shanghai World Financial Center. Fans had an opportunity to participate in the video by wearing a SNH48 "Flying Get" T-shirt.

JKT48 version

On February 15, 2014, JKT48 announced the group's fifth single to be "Flying Get".

Promotion and release
This single has the voting tickets for JKT48's 6th single Senbatsu Sosenkyo.

Personnel
Melody Laksani is the center performer for the title track. The performers are listed as follows:
 Team J: Ayana Shahab, Devi Kinal Putri, Ghaida Farisya, Haruka Nakagawa, Jessica Vania, Jessica Veranda, Melody Nurramdhani Laksani, Nabilah Ratna Ayu Azalia, Rezky Whiranti Dhike, Sendy Ariani, Shania Junianatha
 Team KIII : Alicia Chanzia, Cindy Yuvia, Ratu Vienny Fitrilya, Shinta Naomi, Viviyona Apriani

Track listing

Notes

References

External links 
 "Flying Get" Type-A disc page on King Records 
 "Flying Get" Type-A disc page on Oricon 

2011 singles
AKB48 songs
Songs with lyrics by Yasushi Akimoto
Japanese television drama theme songs
Oricon Weekly number-one singles
Billboard Japan Hot 100 number-one singles
RIAJ Digital Track Chart number-one singles
King Records (Japan) singles